James Britton Cranfill (September 12, 1858 – December 28, 1942) was an American religious figure and prohibitionist who served as the Prohibition Party's vice presidential nominee in 1892.

Life

James Britton Cranfill was born in Whitt, Texas on September 12, 1858, to Eaton Cranfill and Martha Galloway. He began to study medicine under his father in 1870 and received his medical certificate at age 21 in 1879. In 1890, he was ordained as a Baptist pastor and in 1892 he founded the Baptist Standard which he also served as editor of.

On July 1, 1892, he narrowly defeated Joshua Levering for the Prohibition Party's vice presidential nomination with 416 delegates to 332 delegates after a story circulated that Levering was a member of the coffee industry. General John Bidwell was given the presidential nomination and the ticket received 270,813 votes for 2.24% of the popular vote which is the best performance of any Prohibition presidential ticket. At the Prohibition Party's 1896 convention he was elected as chairman of the resolutions committee to create the party's platform and supported the narrow gauger faction of the party and presidential nominee Joshua Levering. In 1908 he ran for the Prohibition Party's presidential nomination, but only received 28 delegates compared to Eugene Chafin's 636 delegates.

On December 28, 1942, he died in Dallas, Texas at age 84 after suffering a stroke on December 24.

References

1858 births
1942 deaths
Writers from Texas
Baptists from Texas
People from Dallas
People from Parker County, Texas
American temperance activists
Texas Prohibitionists
20th-century American politicians
Prohibition Party (United States) vice presidential nominees
1892 United States vice-presidential candidates